Karuna Trust (Sri Lanka) is a voluntary non-profit organization dedicated to improving the living standards of materially poor people in Sri Lanka.

Sri Lanka has a large majority of its population living below minimum economic conditions. Most of the rural population in Sri Lanka are extremely poor and a vast majority still lack proper housing, medical care, education, and employment. The Trust fund projects that eradicate poverty. The Trust started in 2003 from the suggestions of Karuranatne & Sons, a large local printing company, and its chairman.

References

External links 
 / The charity's own site

Charities based in Sri Lanka
Rural community development
Development charities